Olov Arthur Ternström  (1 February 1927 – 22 July 2001) was a Swedish diplomat.

Career
Ternström was born in Lund, Sweden, the son of an accountant Arthur Ternström and his wife Astrid (née Andersson). He gained a degree in economics at the Stockholm School of Economics in 1949 and received the title of civilekonom. He served in the Swedish General Export Association (Sveriges allmänna exportförening) from 1948 to 1957 before becoming an attaché at the Ministry for Foreign Affairs in 1957. Ternström served in Washington, D.C. in 1958, was the secretary at the Foreign Ministry in 1961 and director at the Upplysningsberedningen in 1961 which was a coordinating committee for overseas information.

He was then consul in Hong Kong in 1964, press counsellor in London in 1967 and trade counsellor there in 1971. Ternström was deputy head of the Administration Department at the Foreign Ministry in 1973. He was ambassador in Tunis in 1976 and served in the Swedish UN delegation in New York City in 1978. Ternström was ambassador in Cairo and in Khartoum from 1981 to 1986. In 1981, while Ternström was ambassador in Egypt, he escaped unhurt after the Egyptian President Anwar Sadat was assassinated. He ended his diplomatic career by being ambassador in Bangkok from 1986 to 1992.

Personal life
Ternström was married twice. In 1955 he married Margareta Röningberg, the daughter of school teacher Erik Röningberg and sculptress Ingrid (née Geijer). In 1983 Ternström married Myrtle Langham. Ternström was towards the end of his life a resident of Cheltenham, England. Ternström died on 22 July 2001 and was buried at Bromma Cemetery.

References

1927 births
2001 deaths
Ambassadors of Sweden to Tunisia
Ambassadors of Sweden to Egypt
Ambassadors of Sweden to Sudan
Ambassadors of Sweden to Thailand
Stockholm School of Economics alumni
People from Lund
Swedish expatriates in England